The Bangladesh Delta Plan is a comprehensive development plan formulated by Government of Bangladesh in 2018 focusing on economic growth, environmental conservation, and enhanced climate resilience.

See also
Climate change in Bangladesh

References

Environmental management schemes
2018 in Bangladesh